St. Mary's Orthodox Syrian Church is a parish of the Malankara Orthodox Syrian Church situated in the small Keralan village of Kallooppara, India. The church is a representation of the shingled roof tops in the early Travancore style. 

The church has been renovated with a newly built balcony to accommodate more people during holy mass. Also a manimalika (place to suspend the church bell) has been built near the church.

Church history
In earlier days, Christians of Kallooppara depended on Niranam Church for the holy mass, religious rites and ceremonies. The journey by vallam (a Malayalam/proto-Malayalam term for a small boat) through rivers of Manimala River and Pampa was tedious, tiresome and risky.

The Edappally Kings were in rule at this time. The famous Elangalloor Maddom, rich in its architectural antiquity, located on northern banks of the Manimala River served as an abode for the royal guests. This structure, well-equipped with a private pool called the 'Kullipura Mallika' was beautified with granite rock paved steps leading to the Manimala River. (This can still be seen now in Angadikadavu of Puramattam panchayat) Once, while the ruling king of Edappally was having his rest in the Elangalloor Maddom, he observed few people coming on a small boat singing melodious hymns and chanting prayers. The king immediately stepped down to the river bank for better observation and found it to be a funeral procession, with the corpse on the floating hearse covered with white cloths. He learned that procession started from Manimala and was heading to Niranam Church for the burial, since Niranam Church was the only Christian church in central Travancore those days. Subsequent to the burial of the first dead body on the ground, a handful of Nasranis.

According to local history, this sight moved the King's heart and allowed him to realize the hardship of his Christian subjects. He pointed to a plot on the other side of the river and gave sanction to bury the body and built a church there. Though there is no clear evidence of the origin and age of the church, folklore says that the foundation stone was consecrated on 3rd Karkkidakam (Malayalam calendar). The stone day of the church is being celebrated on that day. The founding stone of the present church was laid on Malayalam month Karkkidakam 3rd of 515 (1339).

Early challenges 
It was during the time of Adangappurathu Valiya Avirah Tharakan, around AD 1750, that the Kalloopara St. Mary's Orthodox church was ordered to be demolished by a Judge from Travancore High Court of Quilon, as the church had incurred huge debts. Adangappurathu Valiya Avirah Tharakan was grandson of Avirah Tharakan of Sankara Puri and Maria/Shri Devi – niece of the Edappally King; the couple came and settled down in Puramattam at "vacated Theramel Illam" in AD 1669.  After the court hearings, the judge ordered the entire church building to be demolished and its land to be taken over by the creditor (Pocku Moosa Haji – Quilon). Church members went across the river and informed Valiya Avirah Tharakan. Valiya Avirah Tharakan immediately paid off all of its debts by a form of gold "bananas" from the ara ('safe'), and took control of the church and its property. While holding complete control of Perumpranad district on behalf of the Edappally King, Valiya Avirah Tharakan at his own cost took the privilege of rebuilding St. Mary's Orthodox Church for a better outlook (around AD 1755). Some parts of that construction and artwork of the church are still remarkably visible inside, particularly the altar and the roof areas. In recent years, this historical church has grown remarkably as a result of the constant efforts of its enthusiastic members and the outstanding leadership of its vicars from time to time. Many parts of the church were renovated and more buildings were built for other activities to keep up with the pace. In AD 1669, when Avirah Tharakan of Shankara Puri and his wife Maria/Shri Devi (niece of Edappally King) arrived, they restored law and order in the Perumpanad district (Kallooppara was the headquarters of Perumpanad district). All religious groups have lived in harmony since then and no more blood was shed in the region in the name of religion. Today, this beautiful church remains not only as one of the oldest churches in Travancore, but it also has its own unique pride and credibility in the Malankara Orthodox Church as a pilgrim center.
The Aaruveedan family stood courageously for the existence of this church despite of many obstacles as a result of religious riots and conflicts up until 1750.

References

External links
 Website of Malankara Orthodox Syrian Church
 www.kalloopparapally.com
 http://www.adangapurathu.com

Churches in Pathanamthitta district
Malankara Orthodox Syrian church buildings
Churches completed in 1339
14th-century churches in India